Abdoulaye Keita Keita (born 1 September 2002) is a Spanish footballer who plays as a right winger for Getafe CF B.

Club career
Born in Toledo, Castilla–La Mancha, Keita represented CD Yuncos, Getafe CF and CA Pinto as a youth. On 23 February 2020, aged just 17, he made his senior debut by coming on as a first-half substitute in a 1–2 Tercera División home loss against CF Pozuelo de Alarcón.

In July 2021, after finishing his formation, Keita moved to AD Alcorcón and was assigned to the reserves in the Tercera División RFEF. He scored his first senior goal on 3 October, netting the game's only in a 1–0 away success over Villaverde San Andrés.

Keita made his first team debut for Alkor on 15 December 2021, replacing Hugo Fraile at half-time in a 1–2 extra-time away loss against Sporting de Gijón in the season's Copa del Rey.

References

External links
AD Alcorcón profile 

2002 births
Living people
Sportspeople from Toledo, Spain
Spanish footballers
Footballers from Castilla–La Mancha
Association football wingers
Tercera División players
Tercera Federación players
AD Alcorcón B players
AD Alcorcón footballers
Getafe CF B players